Aconeceras is an early Cretaceous ammonite included in the oppeliid subfamily Aconeceratidae, characterized by an involute, high-whorled, flat-sided shell that bears a finely serrate keel along the venter. Sutures have narrower and deeper elements than in Protaconeceras.  Aconeceras has been found in western Europe, South Africa, and eastern Australia. Its stratigraphic range is from the  Upper Barramian to the  Lower Albian.

References
Arkell et al., 1957  Mesozoic Ammonoidea, Treatise on Invertebrate Paleontology Part L. Geol Society of America and Univ Kansas Press R.C Moore (ed) 1957

Early Cretaceous ammonites
Ammonitida genera
Haploceratoidea
Ammonites of Australia